The Brighton by-election, 1886 may refer to:
Brighton by-election, August 1886
Brighton by-election, November 1886